John Peter Richardson III (September 25, 1831 – July 6, 1899) was the 83rd governor of South Carolina from 1886 to 1890.

Richardson was born in Clarendon County, South Carolina to John Peter Richardson II, a former Governor of South Carolina, and Juliana Augusta Manning. After graduating from South Carolina College in 1849, Richardson managed Elmswood Plantation in Clarendon County. He was also elected to the South Carolina House of Representatives during antebellum South Carolina.

With the outbreak of the American Civil War, Richardson enlisted in the Confederate Army in 1862 and was on the staff of Brigadier General James Cantey until the end of the war. After which, he was elected in 1865 to the South Carolina House of Representatives and later that year to the South Carolina Senate. Richardson was not active in politics during the Reconstruction era, however in 1880 he returned as state Treasurer.

In 1886, Richardson was endorsed by Clarendon County Democrats for the candidacy of governor. The recently formed Farmers' Association has significant influence in Richardson's nomination for candidacy. Richardson won the nomination for governorship, and subsequently went on to win the general election. He was inaugurated as governor on November 30, 1886.

During his second term as governor, Richardson established Clemson College, now known as Clemson University. Richardson initially opposed created Clemson because he thought that it would siphon funds away from the already existing University of South Carolina, however, he eventually relented in November 1889 when the college was established.

On July 6, 1899, Richardson died in Columbia and was buried at Old Quaker Cemetery in Camden.

References  

1831 births
1899 deaths
University of South Carolina alumni
Democratic Party governors of South Carolina
University of South Carolina trustees
19th-century American politicians